Ulf Thorbjörn Dageby (born 10 May 1944) is a Swedish rock musician, singer and songwriter. Dageby is mostly known for his role in the leftist "rock orchestra" and theater ensemble Nationalteatern. At the 18th Guldbagge Awards he won the Special Achievement award.

Biography
He was born and grew up in Gothenburg, attended secondary school at Hvitfeldtska and early on his interest in music grew from jazz music, through Bob Dylan to a more rock’n’roll oriented sound. He joined Nationalteatern in 1971 as guitar player and soon became the leading member when it came to writing the group's songs, such as "Barn av vår tid" (Children of Our Time) and "Bara om min älskade väntar", a Swedish translation of Bob Dylan's "Tomorrow is a long time". In 1975 Dageby appeared under the pseudonym "Sillstryparn" at the "Alternativfestival" – an alternative to the Eurovision song contest – performing "Doin the omoralisk schlagerfestival" ("Doin' the Immoral Schlager festival"). He was also one of the main songwriters in Tältprojektet (The Tent Project), a musical theater performance on the history of the Swedish working class, which toured the country the summer of 1977. Dageby made his debut as a solo artist in 1983 with the album En dag på sjön. In addition to his solo work and the many reunions with Nationalteatern, Dageby has written much music for Swedish film and television.

Discography

With Nationalteatern

1972 – Ta det som ett löfte.....ta det inte som ett hot
1974 – Livet är en fest
1976 – Kåldolmar och Kalsipper
1977 (with Nynningen) – Vi kommer leva igen 
1978 – Barn av vår tid
1979 – Rockormen
1980 – Rövarkungens ö
1991 – Nationalteatern rockorkester LIVE
2006 – Nationalteatern rockorkester LIVE

Solo albums
1983 – En dag på sjön
1984 – Lata rika
1986 – Minnen från jorden
1989 – Känsliga soldater

Singles
1981 – Togges Gossar; Barflickans Längtan/En Hälsning Till Våren
1984 – Mitt Hus Är Försvunnet!/Mitt Rum
1989 – Barn/Underbara Rum
1990 – Dansar/Dansar (på en söndag)

Compilations
1992 – Neonskogen/soundtracks 79–92
1995 – Underbara Rum
2002 – 18 sånger – en samling

Film music
1979 – Ett anständigt liv
1985 – Själen är större än världen
1987 – Hotet
1989 – Täcknamn Coq Rouge
1993 – Rosenbaum. Målbrott
1997 – Beck
1997 – Beck – Mannen med ikonerna
1997 – Beck – Pensionat Pärlan
1997 – Slussen
1997 – Beck – Spår i mörker
1998 – Beck – The Money Man
1998 – Beck – Monstret
1998 – Beck – Vita nätter
1998 – Beck – Öga för öga
2001 – Kommissarie Winter – Sol och skugga
2003 – Om jag vänder mig om

References

External links
Official MySpace
Nationalteatern's website
Nationalteaterns MySpace

1944 births
Living people
Swedish male musicians
Swedish songwriters
Musicians from Gothenburg